Arthur Siegel (December 31, 1923 - September 13, 1994) was an American songwriter.

Born on December 31, 1923, in Lakewood Township, New Jersey, he grew up in Asbury Park, New Jersey. Siegel studied acting at the American Academy of Dramatic Arts and studied music at the Juilliard School.

Hits he composed included "Monotonous" (written in collaboration with June Carroll, famously performed by Eartha Kitt), "Penny Candy", "Love is a Simple Thing" and "I Want You to Be the First One to Know". His work was featured prominently in the Leonard Sillman-produced revues New Faces of 1952, New Faces of 1956 and New Faces of 1962.

In 1962, Siegel collaborated with Kaye Ballard on an LP, Peanuts, on which he played Charlie Brown and she played Lucy Van Pelt from the album's comic strip namesake by Charles M. Schulz, dramatizing a series of vignettes drawn from the strip's archive.

Siegel released several recordings of himself performing his own music, including 1992's Arthur Siegel Sings Arthur Siegel and 1995's Live at the Ballroom.

Siegel died at the age of 70 on September 13, 1994, at his home in Manhattan due to heart failure.

References

External links
The Arthur Siegel Website
Arthur Siegel papers, 1938-1994 Music Division, New York Public Library for the Performing Arts.
[ Arthur Siegel on Allmusic]

Article in the New York Times: "Arthur Siegel's Surprising Songs"

1923 births
1994 deaths
American Academy of Dramatic Arts alumni
Juilliard School alumni
People from Asbury Park, New Jersey
People from Lakewood Township, New Jersey
Songwriters from New Jersey
20th-century American musicians